AFAP1 antisense RNA 1 is a protein that in humans is encoded by the AFAP1-AS1 gene.

References

Further reading 

Genes on human chromosome 4